The 2016 American Samoa Republican presidential caucuses took place on March 22 in the U.S. territory of American Samoa as one of the Republican Party's primaries ahead of the 2016 presidential election.

On the same day, the Republican Party held a primary in Arizona and caucuses in Utah, while the Democratic Party held primaries and caucuses in three states. The Democratic Party's own Democratic Samoa caucus has already been held on March 1, 2016.

Results

The delegates were originally elected as unbound but all 9 delegates declared their support for Trump after Trump became the presumptive nominee.

Delegates 
 Utu Abe Malae (Republican Party Chairman) (automatically a delegate)
 Su’a Carl Schuster (National Committeeman) (automatically a delegate)
 Congresswoman Aumua Amata (National Committeewoman) (automatically a delegate)
 Vice Chairman John Raynar (Trump's local campaign chair)
 Taulapapa William Sword
 Charles Warren (Cruz's local campaign chairman)
 Party Treasurer Tina Ioane
 Ann Longnecker
 Joan Galea'i Holland

Alternates 
 Jim Longnecker
 Salote Schuster
 Atonio Ioane
 Lucia Bartley
 John Laumatia
 Roy Hall

References

American Samoa
2016 American Samoa elections
2016
March 2016 events in the United States